Gen. Nga Htwe Yu was one of the Four Paladins of King Anawrahta during the Bagan dynasty. He was formerly a palm tree climber from Myinmu and said to be capable of dealing with a thousand palm trees in one morning. He was later knighted by Anawrahta and served as a leading general of the Royal Army.

References

Burmese generals